The Macacu River is a river of Rio de Janeiro state in southeastern Brazil.

Course

The basin of the Macacu River is partly protected by the  Bacia do Rio Macacu Environmental Protection Area, part of the Central Rio de Janeiro Atlantic Forest Mosaic.
The Macacu River flows through a flat region of mangroves in the  Guanabara Ecological Station before discharging into the east of Guanabara Bay near the city of Rio de Janeiro.

See also
List of rivers of Rio de Janeiro

References

Sources

Rivers of Rio de Janeiro (state)